Sijavand (also Romanized as Sījāvand; also known as Sejāvand and Sajāwand) is a village in Bala Khaf Rural District, Salami District, Khaf County, Razavi Khorasan Province, Iran. At the 2006 census, its population was 935, in 209 families.

References 

Populated places in Khaf County